Magnus Kofod Andersen (born 10 May 1999) is a Danish professional footballer who plays as a midfielder for  club Venezia.

Club career
Kofod started playing football at a local club called Hundested IK. Later, he got contacted by scouts from FC Nordsjælland, and joined the club at the age of 10.

Kofod's first senior experience was on 17 February 2017, where he sat on the bench for the whole game against Lyngby Boldklub. He got his debut for FC Nordsjælland on 17 July 2017. Kofod started on the bench, but replaced Mathias Jensen in the 74th minute in a 2-1 victory against OB in the Danish Superliga. Kofod plays with shirt number 38 for the senior team. Despite his young age, Kofod was nominated as the MOTM by Arbejdernes Landsbank after a victory against F.C. Copenhagen.

After 171 games for Nordsjælland, it was confirmed on 14 May 2022, that Kofod would leave the club at the end of the season, when his contract expired. On 26 May 2022, Kofod signed a three-year deal with an option for a fourth year, with newly relegated Italian Serie B-club Venezia.

International career
In November 2020 he was called up to Kasper Hjulmand's senior squad for the friendly against Sweden due to several cancellations from, among others, the Danish national team players playing in England, due to the COVID-19 restrictions, as well as a case of COVID-19 in the squad, which had put several national team players in quarantine.

References

External links
 
 

1999 births
Living people
Danish men's footballers
Danish expatriate men's footballers
Denmark under-21 international footballers
Denmark youth international footballers
People from Hundested
Association football midfielders
Danish Superliga players
FC Nordsjælland players
Venezia F.C. players
Sportspeople from the Capital Region of Denmark
Danish expatriate sportspeople in Italy
Expatriate footballers in Italy